Loretta Gyorgy is a female former Hungarian international table tennis player.

She won a silver medal during the 1948 World Table Tennis Championships in the Corbillon Cup for Hungary. The team consisted of Gizi Farkas, Béla Vermes and Rozsi Karpati.

See also
 List of World Table Tennis Championships medalists

References

Hungarian female table tennis players
World Table Tennis Championships medalists
Year of birth missing (living people)
Living people